Abiel Abbot (August 17, 1770 – June 7, 1828) was a prominent clergyman. He was born to John and Abigail Abbot in Andover, Massachusetts. In 1788 he went on to study at Harvard University. In 1792 he received the Bachelor of Arts degree with honors.

He was an assistant teacher at Phillips Academy, Exeter, New Hampshire, until August 1793. He started working as a preacher in Haverhill, Massachusetts, in 1794 and remained there through 1803, having been selected as pastor in 1795. He married Eunice Wales in 1796. He moved to Beverly, Massachusetts, in 1803, and became a pastor there of the First Church. He remained in that position through the end of his life.

In 1821, he received the degree of Doctor of Divinity from Harvard University.

To recover his health he passed the winter of 1827–1828 in and near Charleston, South Carolina, and embarked for Cuba in the spring of 1828. In Cuba he visited the cities, villages and plantations at Matanzas and Havana. He died of yellow fever on his way back from Charleston to New York. His remains were deposited in the cemetery on Staten Island, and the funeral service was performed by the Rev. Mr Miller.

He had one book published posthumously, Letters Written in the Interior of Cuba, in 1829.

References
Who Was Who in America, Historical Volume, 1607-1896. Chicago: Marquis Who's Who, Incorporated.

External links
Abiel Abbot Letters Written in the Interior of Cuba, Between the Mountains of Arcana, to the East, and of Cusco, to the West, in the Months of February, March, April, and May, 1828. Boston: Bowles and Dearborn, 1829. 
Abiel Abbot, Sermons by the Late Rev. Abiel Abbot, D.D. of Beverly, Mass. Boston: Wait, Greene & Co., 1831. 
Appleton's Cyclopedia of American Biography, edited by James Grant Wilson, John Fiske and Stanley L. Klos. Six volumes, New York: D. Appleton and Company, 1887-1889. 

1770 births
1828 deaths
19th-century American clergy
18th-century American clergy
American Christian clergy
American memoirists
Harvard Divinity School alumni
Deaths from yellow fever
People from Andover, Massachusetts
18th-century Christian clergy
19th-century Christian clergy
People of colonial Massachusetts
Burials in New York (state)
People who died at sea
American expatriates in Cuba
People from Beverly, Massachusetts